Tiruvilanagar Uchiravaneswarar Temple is a Hindu temple located at Tiruvila Nagar  in Mayiladuthurai district of Tamil Nadu, India.  The presiding deity is Shiva. He is called as Uchira Vaneswarar. His consort is known as Veyuru Tholi Ammai.

Significance 
It is one of the shrines of the 275 Paadal Petra Sthalams - Shiva Sthalams glorified in the early medieval Tevaram poems by Tamil Saivite Nayanar Tirugnanasambandar.

Literary mention 
Tirugnanasambandar describes the feature of the deity as:

References

External links

Gallery

Shiva temples in Mayiladuthurai district
Padal Petra Stalam